New Tradition may refer to:

The New Tradition, a California barbershop quartet
New Tradition Chorus, an Illinois men's barbershop chorus
New Tradition, 2012 album by Dark New Day
A New Tradition, 2001 EP album by Snailhouse
New Traditions in East Asian Bar Bands, album by John Zorn
New Kadampa Tradition, a global Buddhist organisation

See also
New Traditionalists, a 1981 album by Devo
Neotraditional (disambiguation)
Traditionalism (disambiguation)